The EMD SD70 is a series of diesel-electric locomotives produced by the US company Electro-Motive Diesel in response to the GE Dash 9-44CW. Production commenced in late 1992 and since then over 5,700 units have been produced; most of these are the SD70M and SD70MAC models. While the majority of the production was ordered for use in North America, various models of the series have been used worldwide. All locomotives of this series are hood units with C-C trucks, except the SD70ACe-P4 (and presumably the SD70MACH as well) which has a B1-1B wheel configuration, and the SD70ACe-BB, which has a B-B-B-B wheel arrangement.

Superseding the HT-C truck, a new bolsterless radial HTCR truck was fitted to all EMD SD70s built 1992–2002; in 2003 the non-radial HTSC truck (basically the HTCR made less costly by removing radial components) was made standard on the SD70ACe and SD70M-2 models; the radial HTCR truck remained available as an option.

Models

SD70 (1992-1994)

The EMD SD70 typically has the smaller spartan cab, typical on preceding SD60 models, instead of the larger comfort cab used on later models. Notable differences between the SD70 and SD60 are the radial steering EMD HTCR truck instead of the older HTC truck, and the SD70's overall length of 72 ft 4in, the older SD60 being 71 ft 2 in. The SD70 also rides higher as its frame is approximately  higher than the SD60. This model is equipped with direct current (DC) traction motors, which simplifies the locomotive's electrical system by obviating the need for computer-controlled inverters (as are required for alternating current (AC) power). One hundred and twenty-two examples of this model locomotive were produced for Norfolk Southern (NS), Conrail (CR), Illinois Central (IC) and Southern Peru Copper Corporation (SPCC). Conrail's assets were split between Norfolk Southern and CSX in 1999, and all 24 of Conrail's SD70 units went to NS. Other than the CR paint scheme these units were built to NS specifications and numbered (2557 - 2580) in series with Norfolk Southern's already purchased SD70s.

Production of the standard cab at EMD's London, Ontario plant ended in 1994. The 24 Conrail SD70s were assembled from kits at Conrail's Juniata Shops in Altoona, Pennsylvania, where the IC and SPCC SD70s were assembled from kits at Super Steel Schenectady.  Most SD70s are still in service with Norfolk Southern and Canadian National (CN), which merged with Illinois Central in 1999. In February 2017, NS began a program to convert its SD70s from DC to AC, which will also have a new wide-nose cab, and several other upgrades. They will be designated as SD70ACC.

SD70M (1992-2004)

The SD70M has a wide nose and a large comfort cab (officially known as the "North American Safety Cab"), allowing crew members to ride more comfortably inside of the locomotive than the older standard cab designs.  There are two versions of this cab on SD70Ms: the Phase 1 cab, which was first introduced on the SD60M, and the Phase 2 cab, which is a boxier design similar to the original three-piece windscreen on the SD60M, which is shared with the Phase 2 SD90MAC, SD89MAC, and SD80ACe. The Phase 2 cab has a two-piece windscreen like the Phase 1 windscreen but the design of the nose is more boxy, with a taller square midsection for more headroom.

The SD70M is equipped with D90TR DC traction motors and the 710G3B prime mover. They are capable of generating  of continuous tractive effort. From mid-2000, the SD70M was produced with SD45-style flared radiators allowing for the larger radiator cores needed for split-cooling. Split-cooling is a feature that separates the coolant circuit for the prime mover and the circuit for the air pumps and turbocharger.  There are two versions of this radiator: the older version has two large radiator panels on each side, and the newer version has four square panels on each side.  This modification was made in response to the enactment of the United States Environmental Protection Agency's (EPA) Tier 1 environmental regulations. Also the truck was replaced with HTCR-4, instead of HTCR-I on former model.

Production of the SD70M ceased in late 2004 as production of the SD70M-2 model began (the EPA's Tier 2 regulations went into effect on 1 January 2005). 1,609 examples of the SD70M model were produced. Purchasers included CSX, New York, Susquehanna & Western (NYSW; part of EMDX order no. 946531), Norfolk Southern and Southern Pacific (SP; now part of the Union Pacific Railroad), but the vast majority were purchased by Union Pacific.

In 2000, an order of SD70Ms made history when Union Pacific ordered 1000 units of the model (UP 4000 through UP 4999, inclusive, although 4014 was renumbered 4479 to accommodate Big Boy 4014 in 2019). This order was later extended by nearly 500 additional units (UP 3999 and below, UP 5000 and above, except for 3985, which was left vacant for Challenger 3985).

This locomotive model is also built for export, and is still catalogued by EMD (at ). CVG Ferrominera Orinoco has 6 SD70Ms that were built as an add-on order to UPs FIRE cab equipped SD70Ms. Companhia Vale do Rio Doce (CVRD) in Brazil has ordered 55 of this model for service in Carajas pulling trainloads of iron ore.

SD70I (1995)

The SD70I is a version of the SD70 which has been fitted with a cab that is isolated from the frame of the locomotive with rubber gaskets (officially known as a "WhisperCab"). The isolation reduces noise and vibration from the prime mover.  A seam is visible across the nose and on the long hood where the cab connects with the body. 26 examples of this model locomotive were produced, all for Canadian National. The WhisperCab feature was incorporated into some SD70MACs and was standard on both the  SD80MAC and SD90/43MAC models.

SD70MAC (1993-2004)

The SD70MAC uses three phase AC traction motors. Production of the model commenced in 1993, competing against the GE Dash 9-44CW. The Alaska Railroad ordered their locomotives with head-end power to make them suitable for both freight and passenger service; no other railroad ordered this variant. The trucks were replaced with HTCR-4, instead of HTCR-I on former model.

The SD70MAC is no longer produced due to EPA regulations, and was replaced by the SD70ACe in 2004. In total, 1,109 SD70MACs were produced, purchased by Burlington Northern (and its successor, BNSF), Conrail, CSX, Transportación Ferroviaria Mexicana (TFM; units now owned by Kansas City Southern Railway (KCS)), and the Alaska Railroad.

SD70ACe (2004-present) 

The SD70ACe is the successor to the SD70MAC with design changes to comply with emission standards. The engine fires with 15% lower internal pressure to improve emissions and features fewer internal components in the inverter. They are rated at  continuous tractive effort ( starting). Early models featured a bad cab design which was noticed first on CSX as crews reported annoying disturbances such as prime mover noises, traction motors and more. The cab was also known for rattling, leading to the nickname "Thundercabs". As a result, these units are also not approved for leading trains.

In 2012, EMD also built four models known as the SD70ACe-P6. These units, unlike previous SD70ACe's, have one inverter per axle on the trucks, rather than EMD's traditional one inverter per truck design. Four of those ( EMDX 1206,1208,1209 and 1210) were sold to Canadian National Railway and renumbered to CN 8100-8103.

In 2014, BNSF Railway took delivery of 20 SD70ACe-P4 units, numbered 8500 - 8519. This model was designed with a B1-1B wheel arrangement to compete with GE's ES44C4 model, which has an A1A-A1A wheel arrangement. Both wheel arrangements mean that there are only two traction motors per truck instead of three, those being the ones next to the fuel tank.  Two SD70ACe-P4 demonstrators began a 5-year lease at Tacoma Rail in late 2014.

On January 1, 2015, the United States Environmental Protection Agency's Tier 4 locomotive emission regulations went into effect. EMD could not successfully modify the SD70ACe's 2-stroke 710 series prime mover to be Tier 4-compliant; thus, the Tier 3 SD70ACe was succeeded by the SD70ACe-T4 in late 2015. However, US production of the Tier 3-compliant SD70ACe continues with Tier 4 'credit units' (new Tier 3-compliant units EMD is entitled to build based on previously-earned emissions credits). Union Pacific and Norfolk Southern are currently the only US roads to own Tier 4 credit unit SD70ACe's. Additionally, EMD has continued building Tier 3 SD70ACe's for Ferromex (4100-4118), Ferrosur (4119-4133), and Kansas City Southern de Mexico (4200-4224) at Bombardier Ciudad Sahagun. These locomotives are restricted to Mexico-only operation and cannot cross the US border (just as Canadian National's newest Tier 3 GE ES44AC's are restricted to Canadian use only).

In March 2016, EMD replaced the standard cast HTCR-4 trucks on NS SD70ACe 1000 with the new fabricated HTCR-6 trucks for testing. UP and BNSF plan to test the new HTCR-6 trucks on some of their SD70ACe units also.

Union Pacific received 281 additional SD70ACe units, numbered 8824 - 9104, in 2014, 2016 and 2018.

In mid-2021, Yakutian Railways received two SD70ACes, designated 2TE3250 and numbered 0001 and 0002. They are currently in use in Yakutia.

SD70M-2 (2004-2011)

The SD70M-2 is a DC traction version of the SD70ACe, and is nearly identical to the SD70ACe. Production began in 2005.

In total, 331 SD70M-2s were built, with Canadian National owning 190 units. Eight units owned by Electro-Motive Diesel and four units owned by CIT Financial were leased by Florida East Coast Railway until early 2015. Canadian National 8964 was the last SD70M-2, built in February 2011. Vermont Railway own 2 units numbered 431 and 432. Norfolk Southern ordered 130 SD70M-2s; however they were retired in April 2020.

SD70ACe-T4 (2015-present) 

The SD70ACe-T4 is the Tier 4 emissions standards-compliant successor of the SD70ACe. The first locomotive, EMDX 1501, was built in summer 2015, and made its debut at the Railway Interchange Expo in Minneapolis, Minnesota during the weekend of October 3–4, 2015. It features a new 4-stroke engine called the EMD 12-1010 "J" series - a V12 with 1,010 in3 displacement for each cylinder. This new prime mover has a two-stage turbocharger system consisting of three turbos; one turbo (the primary/high pressure turbo) for low-mid RPM and two turbos (the secondary/low pressure turbos) for mid-high RPM. The results of this setup are higher power throughout a broader RPM range, better fuel efficiency, and lower emissions. An EGR system is applied as well, allowing the engine to achieve Tier 4 without the use of urea aftertreatment. Another new feature of this engine is the Double-Walled Fuel Injection System that increases safety and provides simplified maintenance works.

The EMD 12-1010 is capable of producing , but only  is used for traction. The amount of starting tractive effort is equal to that of the  SD90MAC-H while, on the other hand, its continuous tractive effort is higher than that of the SD90MAC-H ( vs. ). The units are also equipped with "radial bogies" which offer increased adhesion and better ride quality.

While it retains the basic SD70 designation, the locomotive has several major new features that set it apart from its successful ancestor such as a vibration-isolated powertrain, and alternator start capability.

Fifteen SD70ACe-T4 demonstrators were built at Muncie, Indiana by November 2016. Union Pacific was the first customer to order SD70ACe-T4's. UP 3012–3014, the first production SD70ACe-T4's, were assigned to active service in early November 2016.

Union Pacific will acquire 100 SD70ACe-T4's: 12 former demonstrators will be rostered as UP 3000–3011, and 88 production units (3012-3099). 3012-3056 were built at Bombardier's Sahagun, Mexico plant. 3057-3099 will be built at Muncie, IN, following completion of the Tier 4 credit SD70ACe's UP 8997–9096. All UP SD70ACe-T4's are classified as SD70AHs.

SD70ACeP4-T4's EMDX 1603 and 1604 were built and painted as demonstrators for the BNSF. These units have a B1-1B wheel arrangement akin to the SD70ACe-P4.

In August 2018, CSX Transportation ordered 10 SD70ACe-T4's, of which all have now been delivered. They are classified by CSX as ST70AH.

Norfolk Southern originally ordered 10 SD70ACe-T4's, but opted for more SD70ACe Tier-4 credit locomotives instead. The cancelled units are currently part of the Progress Rail lease fleet.

EMDX 1501 will remain in Progress Rail Services ownership as a test bed.

SD70ACe/LCi (2005-present) 

The SD70ACe/LCi is a low clearance, export version of the SD70ACe. The LCi in the model designation stands for Low Clearance international as these locomotives are designed to negotiate the tight clearances under the mine equipment. External differences between the SD70ACe and SD70ACe/LCi models include the addition of marker lights, number boards located lower on the nose rather than on top of the cab, windscreen protector panels (to deflect abrasive iron ore when in mid train position), fire suppression canisters, louvre style vents, different horn and subtle differences with handrails.

In 2004, BHP Billiton ordered 14 SD70ACe/LCi locomotives for use on iron ore trains in the Pilbara region of Western Australia. The first member of the class (4300) was purchased for parts and dismantled upon arrival in Australia. This was because it was cheaper to purchase a complete locomotive than buy the components individually. They were named after sidings on the BHP system. Since they did not have the newer, isolated cab of the second and subsequent batches, 4301-4313 were traded in to Progress Rail for locomotives with newer cab assemblies and repatriated to the United States in January 2015 being taken to Muncie, Indiana for store. They were overhauled and sold to Chemin de fer Arnaud (4), Montana Rail Link (4) and Quebec North Shore & Labrador (5).

It operated in 2015 a fleet of 23 SD70ACe/LCi locomotives beside of 142 standard SD70ACe, from which the newest locomotives are built in 2014.

The second batch of 10 SD70ACes (4314-4323) arrived between August and November 2006. An order for a third batch of 13 SD70ACe/LCi's (4334-4346) was placed in August 2007, but such was the demand for locomotive power in the Pilbara region, a deal was done with BNSF for BHP Billiton to purchase ten standard North American SD70ACes (4324-4333) that were in build as their 9166, 9167, 9184–9191. Construction was sufficiently advanced when the deal was concluded for them to have been painted, hence they were delivered in BNSF orange livery. Some modifications have been made to bring them in line with the rest of the fleet. A fifth batch of SD70ACes (Numbers 4347–4355) was delivered in July 2009.

An additional 18 units (numbers 4356–4373) were delivered in the second half of 2010, bringing the total of SD70ACe type locomotives in service to 72. In March 2012, BHP Billiton ordered a further 80. As at October 2020, BHP operated 10 SD70ACes (4324-4333) and 174 SD70 Ace/LCis (4314-4323, 4334-4497)

In July 2012 fellow Pilbara operator, Fortescue Metals Group, took the delivery of the first of a fleet of 19, later extended to 21 (701-721).

SD70ACS (2009-present) 

The SD70ACS is a  AC variant for heavy haul freight, used in desert environments. The first 25 units were ordered for Saudi Railway Company in April 2009 and assembled in the London, Ontario, plant for delivery in the second half of 2010. Special features include a pulse filtration system, movable sand plows, EM2000 control system and FIRE display system.

Mauritania's Société Nationale Industrielle et Minière placed a contract for six SD70ACS locomotives in October 2010.

In July 2011 Etihad Rail ordered seven SD70ACS locomotives for delivery in 2012. Seven locomotives were delivered in 2013.

SD70ACe-BB (2015-present) 
In October 2015, EMD started producing SD70ACe-BB locomotives for Brazilian  railroads.

SD70ACe/45 (2004-present) 
	
The SD70ACe/45 is a diesel-electric locomotive built by EMD plant in Sete Lagoas, MG Brazil. Different from the SD70ACe in North America, the SD70ACe/45 has a longer frame (76 ft. 6 in.) and three radiator fans on the radiator section since it uses the same car body of the SD80ACe produced by EMD plant in London, Canada to Vale mining in Brazil. It uses  gauge. 80 SD70ACe/45s had been built.

SD70IAC (2019-present) 
In early 2019 with the delivery of the new SD70ACe-T4C locomotives to Norfolk Southern, a new type of the T4C (Tier 4 Credit) locomotives was rolled out of Progress Rail in Muncie, Indiana. The SD70IAC, SD standing for Special Duty, 70 standing for 70 series, and IAC standing for Individual Axle Control. They are still classified as SD70ACe's on the side of the locomotive but are designated as SD70IAC within the cab controls. The new IAC system improves the existing traction system.

SD70ACe/LW (2007, 2021-present) 
The SD70ACe/LW is designed specifically for rail networks using Russian gauge, featuring a new isolated cab similar to the flat nosed cab of the GT46-ACE GEN II. The SD70ACe/LW has a 16-710G3C-T2 prime-mover with 4,500 horsepower. It uses an AC traction system with a top speed of 74 mph (120 km/h). Although it was designed in 2007, the first orders only occurred in mid-2021, when 16 were purchased for the Mongolian Tavan Tolgoi-Gashuunsukhait Railway project.

Rebuilds

SD70ACU

The SD70ACU was first built by EMD and later rebuilt by Norfolk Southern. It is originally an SD90MAC (or better known as a SD9043MAC) that has been rebuilt to renew its Mitsubishi electrical components and replace the cab with the new EMD Phase-II cab to comply with the most recent safety requirements. These locomotives are similar to the SD70ACe model, but the main body features are all reminiscent to the SD90MAC features. They also have the latest EMD cab that meets current FRA crashworthiness standards. These locomotives also have the Ultra Cab II, locomotive speed limiter (LSL), and cab signals. 100 of the 110 units Norfolk Southern purchased were originally SD9043MACs previously operated by Union Pacific. The other 10 units were acquired by a trade with Cit Group for MP15DCs. All NS-owned SD9043MACs were rebuilt by NS at its shops in Altoona, Pennsylvania. By May 7, 2019, all 110 SD70ACU units owned by Norfolk Southern were completed and released to active service. 46 of these were sold in November 2020.

Canadian Pacific has also began a program to convert their SD90MAC units into SD70ACUs, but unlike Norfolk Southern, Progress Rail is performing the rebuilds. The first of these have since been released. The initial order was for 30 units and then increased to 60. Canadian Pacific originally rostered 61 SD90MACs, which spent much of the 2010-decade parked in long-term storage, with the exception of three, which were retired and scrapped in 2012. The remaining 58, along with two surplus Union Pacific SD90MACs, will be used as cores for the 60 SD70ACUs. 10 have been painted in the classic CP tuscan and grey paint scheme, and 5 as special armed forces units. The remainder will receive the standard CP red paint scheme.

SD70ACC
The SD70ACC is the latest rebuild in Norfolk Southern's DC to AC program. It has the new EMD safety cab, similar to the SD70ACe cab, but with the “teardrop windshield”, much like the SD70ACe-T4.

Norfolk Southern is rebuilding its fleet of SD70s into SD70ACC specifications. The first two units, 1800 and 1801, were unveiled in a special yellow and grey paint scheme to promote the DC to AC program, similar to the paint schemes used on the first GE AC44C6M. As of January 2020, 52 units have been rebuilt and have since been released to service.

SD70MACe
The SD70MACe is a rebuilt SD70MAC locomotive with new Mitsubishi electronics and traction motors to replace the Siemens traction motors, first rebuilt for the BNSF Railway, and later rebuilt for CSX (classified as SD70AC) and KCS.

SD70MACH
The SD70MACH is a SD70MAC rebuilt by Progress Rail for Metra. The rebuild also includes the addition of head end power along with meeting Tier 3 emissions. Metra has approved of a purchase of 15 SD70MACHs for passenger service, with options of up to 27 more. They are the first six-axle passenger engines since the EMD F40C and the Alaska Railroad's HEP-equipped SD70MACs. The first unit was delivered in 2022 and is expected to enter service in 2023.

Operators

Preservation
On November 8, 2019, Union Pacific donated SD70ACe No. 4141 to the George H.W. Bush Presidential Library and Museum. The locomotive, painted in honor of George H. W. Bush, was unveiled in October 2005 and was in active service until 2009, when it was placed into storage due to the financial crisis of 2007–2010. It was brought back in 2018 to participate in Bush's funeral train on December 6, 2018. The locomotive subsequently remained in active service following the funeral until its last run between November 8 and November 9, as part of the Union Pacific 4014 Southwest Tour, in which the plans for the display were unveiled. The locomotive arrived back at College Station on March 12, 2021 and is now undergoing final preparations for the opening of the display.

Gallery

Footnotes

References
 
 
 
 
 
 Kansas City Southern 4006 Salutes Veterans Past and Present: https://www.koamnewsnow.com/news/kansas-city-southern-4006-salutes-veterans

Further reading
 

BHP Billiton diesel locomotives
C-C locomotives
Diesel-electric locomotives of the United States
Diesel locomotives of Western Australia
SD70 series
EPA Tier 2-compliant locomotives of the United States
Freight locomotives
Railway locomotives introduced in 1992
Standard gauge locomotives of the United States
SD70
Standard gauge locomotives of Canada
Standard gauge locomotives of Mexico
Standard gauge locomotives of Australia
5 ft 3 in gauge locomotives
Standard gauge locomotives of Peru
Standard gauge locomotives of Saudi Arabia
Standard gauge locomotives of Mauritania
Standard gauge locomotives of the United Arab Emirates
Diesel-electric locomotives of Australia
Diesel-electric locomotives of Canada
Diesel-electric locomotives of Mexico
Diesel-electric locomotives of Peru
Diesel-electric locomotives of Saudi Arabia
Diesel-electric locomotives of Mauritania
Diesel-electric locomotives of the United Arab Emirates